Les Cent Contes drolatiques (French, "The Hundred Facetious Tales") — known as Droll Stories — is a collection of 30 ribald short stories by Honoré de Balzac. They resemble Boccaccio's Decameron, an assertion made by the author himself in the 1832 preface. They were first published in Paris in two separate volumes by Charles Gosselin and Edmond Werdet in 1832 and 1837. Of the intended 100 tales, Balzac completed only 30, grouped into three "decades" (groups of ten).

According to the author:

Style
Droll Stories constitute an unusual project of playful and parodic writing motivated by the author's desire to "remain oneself by cooking in front of the mold of others". The collection caused a great scandal at the time, and was frequently banned in other countries, as much by its earthiness as by the fantasies of an imagined language.

Indeed, Balzac's multi-language, of Rabelaisian inspiration, and which wanted to reproduce a Middle Ages spanning three centuries and thirteen reigns, is made up of neologisms, forged words, learned technical terms with their numerous Latinisms, but also dialects and burlesques — not to mention the puns — all served by archaic spelling and constructions which give the tales a tone and a style deemed by the author to be in keeping with his project, namely a "concentric book" in a "concentric work".

This collection is much more Balzacian than first thought. In particular with regard to the style, unexpected in Balzac, declared shocking, and to which Georges Jacques returns: "Already between 1830 and 1850 emerges what some have called the total subversion of the subject and it will be a question of giving perhaps one day their exact place in the Droll Stories."

The difference in inspiration with Louis Lambert or Séraphîta—short stories he wrote at the same time as these tales—has greatly intrigued critics. According to Roland Chollet, the humorous vein "served Balzac as an experimental space, and as an antidote to romantic seriousness". Oliver also sees in it "an aesthetic bet: is it possible, in the 19th century, to rediscover while renewing the historical sources of a very French laughter?". For Stefan Zweig, such a combination of such disparate writings carried out simultaneously can only be explained by his desire to test his genius, in order to see to what level he could go: just like an architect, by making the plan of a building, calculates the dimensions and the effects of the load, Balzac wanted to test his forces by establishing the foundations on which would rise his Human Comedy.

Historical characters
Many famous figures from history inspired Balzac. He notably dedicated an entire tale to Scipio Sardini, Count of Chaumont (1526–1609), banker of Henry III of France and Catherine de Medici, whose father was gonfalonier of the lordship of Lucca in Tuscany. This Frenchman of Italian origin, who was one of the Italian "supporters" of Catherine de Medici's entourage, left an architectural trace in Paris: the Hôtel Scipion Sardini (1565), at no. 13 rue Scipion, a residence built for his mistress Isabelle de Limeuil. He also became the owner of the Château de Chaumont-sur-Loire from 1600 to 1667. In La Chière nuictée d'amour, Scipion Sardini is a victim of his love for the wife of the Parisian lawyer Pierre des Avenelles, the affair taking place against the background of the preparations for the conspiracy of Amboise (1560).

The Lord of Rochecorbon, the Count of Montsoreau and Jeanne de Craon are also the protagonists of Le Péché véniel, and they naturally find themselves in grotesque situations with many references to virginity and bed issues.

The Bishop of Coire, secretary to the Archbishop of Bordeaux, is himself caught in the nets of the seduction of La Belle Impéria, threatened with excommunication for having committed the sin of the flesh.

Illustrations
Besides Albert Robida and Gustave Doré, many painters and caricaturists were inspired by Balzac's Contes drolatiques. Albert Dubout produced a delirious version of it. Illustrations for it were among the last completed works of Mervyn Peake.

The stories
This list is that of the 13th edition by Garnier Frères, Paris 1924. Each tale is framed by a prologue and an epilogue, which are also tasty pieces of Balzacian literature. "L'Avertissement du Libraire" (Balzac himself) which appears in the first edition of 1832 (first ten) was taken up in the 1855 edition (the fifth) by this publisher.

First 10 tales
 La Belle Impéria
 Le Péché véniel
 La Mye du Roy
 L'Héritier du Diable
 Les Ioyeulsetez du roy Loys le unziesme
 La Connestable
 La pucelle de Thilhouze
 Le Frère d'armes
 Le Curé d'Azay-le-rideau
 L'Apostrophe

Second 10 tales
 Les trois Clercs de Saint-Nicholas
 Le Ieusne de Françoys premier
 Les bons Proupos des religieuses de Poissy
 Comment feut basty le chasteau d'Azay
 La faulse Courtizane
 Le Dangier d'estre trop coquebin
 La Chière nuictée d'amour
 Le Prosne du ioyeulx curé de Meudon
 Le Succube
 Desespérance d'amour

Third 10 tales
 Persévérance d'amour
 D'ung iusticiard qui ne se remembroyt les chouses
 Sur le Moyne Amador, qui feut ung glorieux Abbé de Turpenay
 Berthe la repentie
 Comment la belle Fille de Portillon quinaulda son iuge
 Cy est demonstré que la Fortune est touiours femelle
 D'ung paouvre qui avait nom le Vieulx-par-chemins
 Dires incongrus de trois pèlerins
 Naifveté
 La belle Impéria mariée

References

Honoré de Balzac
Short stories
1832 in literature
1837 in literature
Satirical books
Grotesque